Tiszakécske Labdarugó Club is a Hungarian football club from the town of Tiszakécske, Hungary.

History
Tiszakécske FC debuted in the 1997–98 season of the Hungarian League and finished fifteenth. The relegation play-offs were lost against III. Kerületi TVE and the club were relegated.

Current squad

Stadium

First pitch
The first sample football match of Tiszakécske FC was announced to be played on 27 July 1997 against Diósgyőri VTK
The old stadium capacity 9000 person witch is 4500 seats and 5500 stands. The record attendance is 9000 person against Újpest TE on 28 February 1998

Honours

Domestic
 Hungary
 Nemzeti Bajnokság II 
  First place (1): 1996–97
 Nemzeti Bajnokság III 
  Winners (1): 1992-93
  Winners (1): 2017–18
  Winners (1): 2020–21
 Megyei Bajnokság I 
  Winners (1): 1991-92
  Winners (1): 2016-17

Name Changes 
1945 Újkécskei MOVE
1945 - 1949 Újkécskei SE
1949 - 1950 Újkécskei KIOSz
1950 - 1951 Tiszakécskei Sz. KIOSz
1951 - 1955 Tiszakécskei SK
1955 - 1956 Tiszakécskei Traktor
1956 - 1957 Tiszakécskei Bástya
1957 - 1960 Tiszakécskei SK
1960 - 1975 Tiszakécskei Permetezőgépgyár
1975- 1980 Tiszakécskei KSK
1980- 1993 Tiszakécske LC
1993–1996: Tiszakécskei Futball Club
1996–1997: Tiszakécske FC-Eurobusz
1997–1999: Tiszakécske FC
1999: Affiliated with Tiszakécske FC-Cegléd

Notable players
Had international caps for their respective countries. Players whose name is listed in bold represented their countries while playing for Tiszakécske FC.

Sponsorship

External links
 Profile

References

Football clubs in Hungary
2015 establishments in Hungary
Association football clubs established in 2015